Little Mountain Historic District is a national historic district located at Little Mountain, Newberry County, South Carolina.  The district encompasses 50 contributing buildings and 2 contributing structures in the railroad town of Little Mountain.  The buildings date from about 1890 to 1950 and include residences, businesses, and other institutional buildings.  They include examples of the Gothic Revival, Neo-Classical, Colonial Revival, Victorian or Queen Anne, and Bungalow styles.

It was listed on the National Register of Historic Places in 2003.

References

Historic districts on the National Register of Historic Places in South Carolina
Victorian architecture in South Carolina
Gothic Revival architecture in South Carolina
Colonial Revival architecture in South Carolina
Neoclassical architecture in South Carolina
Queen Anne architecture in South Carolina
Historic districts in Newberry County, South Carolina
National Register of Historic Places in Newberry County, South Carolina